The Monroe Free Press is a weekly newspaper serving the Monroe, Louisiana, El Dorado, Arkansas area.  The Free Press, established in 1969 by Roosevelt Wright, Jrl, is the larger of two weekly newspapers in Monroe serving the African-American community.

See also
Monroe News Star —  Monroe, Louisiana daily newspaper

External links
Monroe Free Press online

Mass media in Monroe, Louisiana
Newspapers published in Louisiana
Weekly newspapers published in the United States